Obania tullia, the orange obania, is a butterfly in the family Lycaenidae. It is found in Nigeria (the Cross River loop), Cameroon, Gabon and the Republic of the Congo. Its natural habitat is African tropical forests.

References

Butterflies described in 1892
Poritiinae
Butterflies of Africa